Honourable Justice (R) Dr. Tanzil-ur-Rahman, Tamgha-e-Imtiaz, (born 1928) is a prominent Pakistani jurist and scholar of Islamic studies. He was the Chief Justice of the Federal Shariat Court (1990–92), member of the Islamic Research Council and the Council of Islamic Ideology (1980–84). He is the author of numerous books on the codification of Islamic law.

He has been called an "enthusiastic and skillful champion" of advancing the cause of "Islamic reform" of Pakistani law, i.e. interpreting the Pakistani constitution and law to implement Sharia law in Pakistan.

Life and education

Justice Tanzil-ur-Rahman was born on 16 June 1928 at Nagina, District Bijnor, U.P. India. In 1948, he graduated from Agra University and migrated to Pakistan. He completed his M.A. (1952), LL.B. (1954), and PhD in Islamic Law (1971) from Karachi University. He was awarded Tamgah-i-Imtiaz in 1971 by the Government of Pakistan for his contribution to Islamic Law.

Bibliography

Tanzil-ur-Rahman, Muslim family laws ordinance: Islamic & social survey, (1997)

Tanzil-ur-Rahman, Objectives resolution and its impact on Pakistan constitution and law, (1996)

Tanzil-ur-Rahman, The judgment that could not be delivered: in re, international loan agreements under Shari’at, (1994)

Tanzil-ur-Rahman, Jurm o sazā kā Islāmī falsafah, (1982)

Tanzil-ur-Rahman, Islāmī qavānīn: ḥudūd, qiṣāṣ, diyat va taʻzīrāt, (1980)

Tanzil-ur-Rahman, Islāmī niẓām-i adālat, (1978)

Tanzil-ur-Rahman, A code of Muslim personal law, (1978)

Tanzil-ur-Rahman, Islamization of Pakistan law: surveying from Islamic point of view, (1978)

Tanzil-ur-Rahman, Majmūʻah-yi qavānīn Islām

Tanzil-ur-Rahman, QULIYAT-E-SHARIYAT

See also
 Chief Justices of the Federal Shariat Court

References

Pakistani judges
Pakistani lawyers
Pakistani scholars
20th-century Muslim scholars of Islam
Muhajir people
Sharia judges
Sunni fiqh scholars
1928 births
Living people